Madenat Alelem University College or Science City University College is a private Iraqi university established in 2005 in Baghdad, Iraq.

See also
 Private universities in Iraq

External links
English: http://www.en.mauc.edu.iq/
Arabic: http://www.mauc.edu.iq/

Universities in Iraq
Education in Baghdad
Educational institutions established in 2005
2005 establishments in Iraq